Sous Le Vent is a fragrance created by Jacques Guerlain in 1933 for American performer Josephine Baker. Interior designer Robert Denning would bring it back from Paris and use it in his automobiles to remind him of Lillian Bostwick Phipps who always wore the scent.

References

Perfumes